Constituencies are used for elections to the Folketing, the national parliament of Denmark. Denmark proper is divided into 10 constituencies largely corresponding to the Provinces of Denmark, (which themselves are statistical divisions of the regions of the country) each electing multiple members using open-list proportional representation. Those constituencies are then divided into 92 opstillingskredse (nomination districts) which mainly serve the purpose of nominating candidates, but historically functioned as single-member constituencies electing one member using plurality voting.

List of constituencies (2007 onwards) 
The following is a list of constituencies used from 2007 onwards.

The Faroe Islands has been one single constituency since 1850. Since 1947 it has elected two members using proportional representation. Greenland has been represented by two members since 1953. Prior to 1975, it was divided into two single-member constituencies.

Prior to the reforms creating the current regions of Denmark in 2007, the constituencies were largely based on the counties, with the exception of Copenhagen, which was divided into 3 separate constituencies.

List of nominating districts 
The following is a list of current nominating constituencies in Denmark proper. In parentheses are the municipalities that each district is part of.

København 

 Østerbro (Copenhagen)
 Sundbyvester (Copenhagen)
 Indre By (Copenhagen)
 Sundbyøster (Copenhagen)
 Nørrebro (Copenhagen)
 Bispebjerg (Copenhagen)
 Brønshøj (Copenhagen)
 Valby (Copenhagen)
 Vesterbro (Copenhagen)
 Falkoner (Frederiksberg)
 Slots (Frederiksberg)
 Tårnby (Tårnby & Dragør)

Københavns omegn 

 Gentofte (Gentofte)
 Lyngby (Lyngby-Taarbæk)
 Gladsaxe (Gladsaxe)
 Rødovre (Rødovre & Herlev)
 Hvidovre (Hvidovre)
 Brøndby (Brøndby, Ishøj & Vallensbæk)
 Taastrup (Høje-Taastrup & Albertslund)
 Ballerup (Ballerup & Glostrup)

Nordsjælland 

 Helsingør (Helsingør)
 Fredensborg (Fredensborg & Hørsholm)
 Hillerød (Hillerød & Gribskov)
 Frederikssund (Frederikssund & Halsnæs)
 Egedal (Egedal & Furesø)
 Rudersdal (Rudersdal & Allerød)

Bornholm 

 Rønne (Bornholm)
 Aakirkeby (Bornholm & Christiansø)

Sjælland 

 Lolland (Lolland)
 Guldborgssund (Guldborgssund)
 Vordingborg (Vordingborg)
 Næstved (Næstved)
 Faxe (Faxe & Stevns)
 Køge (Køge & Lejre)
 Greve (Greve & Solrød)
 Roskilde (Roskilde)
 Holbæk (Holbæk)
 Kalundborg (Kalundborg & Odsherred)
 Ringsted (Ringsted & Sorø)
 Slagelse (Slagelse)

Fyn 

 Odense Øst (Odense)
 Odense Vest (Odense)
 Odense Syd (Odense)
 Assens (Assens)
 Middelfart (Middelfart & Nordfyn)
 Nyborg (Nyborg & Kerteminde)
 Svendborg (Svendborg & Langeland)
 Faaborg (Faaborg-Midtfyn & Ærø)

Sydjylland 

 Sønderborg (Sønderborg)
 Aabenraa (Aabenraa)
 Tønder (Tønder)
 Esbjerg By (Esbjerg & Fanø)
 Esbjerg Omegn (Esbjerg)
 Varde (Varde)
 Vejen (Vejen & Billund)
 Vejle Nord (Vejle)
 Vejle Syd (Vejle)
 Fredericia (Fredericia)
 Kolding Nord (Kolding)
 Kolding Syd (Kolding)
 Haderslev (Haderslev)

Østjylland 

 Århus Syd (Aarhus)
 Århus Vest (Aarhus)
 Århus Nord (Aarhus)
 Århus Øst (Aarhus)
 Djurs (Norddjurs & Syddjurs)
 Rander Nord (Randers)
 Randers Syd (Randers)
 Favrskov (Favrskov)
 Skanderborg (Odder, Samsø & Skanderborg)
 Horsens (Horsens)
 Hedensted (Hedensted)

Vestjylland 

 Struer (Lemvig & Struer)
 Skive (Skive)
 Viborg Vest (Viborg)
 Viborg Øst (Viborg)
 Silkeborg Nord (Silkeborg)
 Silkeborg Syd (Silkeborg)
 Ikast (Ikast-Brande)
 Herning Syd (Herning)
 Herning Nord (Herning)
 Holstebro (Holstebro)
 Ringkøbing (Ringkøbing-Skjern)

Nordjylland 

 Frederikshavn (Frederikshavn & Læsø)
 Hjørring (Hjørring)
 Brønderslev (Brønderslev & Jammerbugt)
 Thisted (Thisted & Morsø)
 Himmerland (Vesthimmerland & Rebild)
 Mariagerfjord (Mariagerfjord)
 Aalborg Øst (Aalborg)
 Aalborg Vest (Aalborg)
 Aalborg Nord (Aalborg)

1971-2005 
The following constituencies were used in the elections between 1971 and 2005.

Previous nominating districts (1971-2005)

Copenhagen 
 Ryvang (Østre)
 Christianshavn (Søndre)
 Rådhus (Søndre)
 Sundby (Søndre)
 Blågård (Søndre)
 Østbane (Østre)
 Husum (Østre)
 Valby (Vestre)
 Amagerbro (Søndre)
 Østerbro (Østre)
 Nørrebro (Østre)
 Bispeeng (Østre)
 Vesterbro (Vestre)
 Enghave (Vestre)
 Bispebjerg (Østre)
 Brønshøj (Østre)

Frederiksberg 

 Gl. Kongevej (Vestre)
 Slots (Vestre)
 Falkoner (Vestre)

Københavns Amt 

 Gentofte (Gentofte)
 Lyngby (Lyngby-Taarbæk & Søllerød)
 Ballerup (Ballerup, Ledøje-Smørum & Værløse)
 Glostrup (Albertslund, Glostrup, Høje-Taastrup, Ishøj & Vallensbæk)
 Hellerup (Gentofte)
 Gladsakse (Gladsakse)
 Hvidovre (Brøndby & Hvidovre)
 Amager (Dragør & Tårnby)
 Rødovre (Herlev & Rødovre)

Frederiksborg 

 Helsingør (Helsingør)
 Fredensborg (Birkerød, Fredensborg-Humlebæk, Græsted-Gilleleje, Hørsholm & Karlebo)
 Hillerød (Allerød, Farum, Hillerød, Slangerup, Stenløse & Ølstykke)
 Frederiksværk (Frederikssund, Frederiksværk, Helsinge, Hundested, Jægerspris, Skibby & Skævinge)

Roskilde 

 Roskilde (Grundsø & Roskilde)
 Køge (Greve, Køge, Solrød & Vallø)
 Lejre (Bramsnæs, Hvalsø, Lejre, Ramsø & Skovbo)

Vestsjælland 

 Holbæk (Holbæk, Jernløse, Tornved & Tølløse)
 Nykøbing (Bjergsted, Dragsholm, Nykøbing-Rørvig, Svinninge, Trundholm)
 Kalundborg (Gørlev, Hvidebæk, Høng & Kalundborg)
 Ringsted (Dianalund, Haslev, Ringsted & Stenlille)
 Sorø (Fuglebjerg, Hashøj, Skælskør & Sorø)
 Slagelse (Korsør & Slagelse)

Storstrøm 

 Præstø (Fakse, Fladså, Præstø, Rønnede & Stevns)
 Næstved (Holmegaard, Næstved & Suså)
 Vordingborg (Langebæk, Møn & Vordingborg)
 Nakskov (Højreby, Nakskov, Ravnsborg & Rudbjerg)
 Maribo (Holeby, Maribo , Nysted, Rødby & Sakskøbing)
 Nykøbing (Nykøbing F., Nørre Alslev, Stubbekøbing & Sydfalster)

Bornholm 

 Rønne (Hasle & Rønne)
 Åkirkeby (Allinge-Gudhjem, Christiansø, Nexø & Åkirkeby)

Fyn 

 Odense Øst (Odense)
 Odense Vest (Odense)
 Odense Syd (Odense)
 Kerteminde (Kerteminde, Langeskov, Munkebo, Ullerslev & Årslev)
 Middelfart (Assens, Ejby, Glamsbjerg, Middelfart & Nørre Aaby)
 Otterup (Bogense, Otterup, Søndersø, Tommerup, Vissenbjerg & Aarup)
 Nyborg (Egebjerg, Gudme, Nyborg, Ryslinge & Ørbæk)
 Svendborg (Rudkøbing, Svendborg, Sydlangeland & Tranekær)
 Fåborg (Broby, Fåborg, Haarby, Marstal, Ringe & Ærøskøbing)

Sønderjylland 

 Haderslev (Christiansfeld & Haderslev)
 Åbenrå (Lundtoft, Rødekro & Aabenraa)
 Sønderborg (Broager, Gråsten & Sønderborg)
 Augustenborg (Augustenborg, Nordborg, Sundeved & Sydals)
 Tønder (Bredebro, Højer, Skærbæk & Tønder)
 Løgumkloster (Bov, Løgumkloster, Nørre-Rangstrup & Tinglev)
 Rødding (Gram, Rødding & Vojens)

Ribe 

 Varde (Blaabjerg, Blåvandshuk, Varde & Ølgod)
 Esbjerg (Esbjerg & Fanø)
 Ribe (Bramming, Helle & Ribe)
 Grindsted (Billund, Brørup, Grindsted, Holsted & Vejen)

Vejle 

 Fredericia (Børkop & Fredericia)
 Kolding (Kolding, Lunderskov & Vamdrup)
 Vejle (Jelling & Vejle)
 Give (Brædstrup, Egtved, Give & Nørre-Snede)
 Juelsminde (Hedensted, Juelsminde & Tørring-Uldum)
 Horsens (Gedved & Horsens)

Ringkøbing 

 Ringkøbing (Holmsland, Lemvig, Ringkøbing, Thyborøn-Harboøre, Trehøje & Ulfborg-Vemb)
 Holstebro (Aulum-Haderup, Holstebro, Struer, Thyholm & Vinderup)
 Herning (Herning & Ikast)
 Skjern (Brande, Egvad, Skjern, Videbæk & Aaskov)

Århus 

 Århus Øst (Århus)
 Århus Nord (Århus)
 Århus Syd (Århus)
 Århus Vest (Århus)
 Mariager (Langå, Mariager, Nørhald, Purhus & Sønderhald)
 Randers (Randers)
 Hammel (Galten, Hadsten, Hammel, Hinnerup, Rosenholm & Rønde)
 Grenå (Ebeltoft, Grenaa, Midtdjurs, Nørre Djurs & Rougsø)
 Skanderborg (Hørning, Odder, Samsø & Skanderborg)
 Silkeborg (Gjern, Ry, Silkeborg & Them)

Viborg 

 Thisted (Hanstholm, Sydthy & Thisted)
 Morsø (Morsø)
 Skive (Fjends, Sallingsund, Skive, Spøttrup & Sundsøre)
 Viborg (Møldrup, Tjele, Viborg & Aalestrup)
 Kjellerup (Bjerringbro, Hvorslev, Karup & Kjellerup)

Nordjylland 

 Frederikshavn (Frederikshavn, Læsø & Skagen)
 Sæby (Brønderslev, Dronninglund & Sæby)
 Hjørring (Hirtshals, Hjørring & Sindal)
 Fjerritslev (Brovst, Fjerritslev, Løkken-Vrå & Pandrup)
 Ålborg Nord (Ålborg, Hals & Aabykro)
 Ålborg Vest (Ålborg)
 Ålborg Øst (Ålborg)
 Hobro (Arden, Hadsund, Hobro, Sejlflod & Skørping)
 Års (Farsø, Løgstør, Nibe, Nørager, Støvring & Års)

1920-1968 
The following constituencies were used in the elections between 1920 and 1968.

Previous nominating districts (1918-1968) 
The following districts were used as nominating districts between 1918 and 1968. In the 1918 election the districts outside of Copenhagen and Frederiksberg functioned as single-member districts, electing a single member.

Copenhagen 

 Vesterbro (Vestre)
 Christianshavn (Søndre)
 Rådhus (Søndre)
 Ravnsborg (Østre)
 Blågård (Søndre)
 Østbane (Østre)
 Rosenborg (Søndre)
 Havne (Søndre)
 Sundby (Søndre) from 1953 known as Sundby-nord
 Østerbro (Østre)
 Nørrebro (Østre)
 Bispeeng (Østre)
 Enghave (Vestre)
 Valby (Vestre) from 1953 known as Valby-øst
 Bispebjerg (Østre)
 Ryvang (Østre from 1950)
 Brønshøj (Østre from 1950)
 Sundby-syd (Søndre from 1953)
 Valby-vest (Vestre from 1953)

Frederiksberg 

 Gl. Kongevej (Vestre)
 Slots (Vestre)
 Falkoner (Vestre)

Københavns Amt 

 Gentofte
 Lyngby
 Roskilde
 Køge
 Lejre
 Hellerup (From 1950)
 Gladsakse (From 1950)
 Hvidovre (From 1953)
 Amager (From 1966)
 Rødovre (From 1966)

Frederiksborg 

 Helsingør
 Fredensborg
 Hillerød
 Frederiksværk

Holbæk 

 Holbæk
 Nykøbing
 Vedby
 Kalundborg-Onsbjerg

Sorø 

 Ringsted
 Sorø
 Slagelse
 Skelskør

Præstø 

 Storeheddinge
 Præstø
 Næstved
 Stege-Vordingborg

Bornholm 

 Rønne
 Åkirkeby

Maribo 

 Nakskov
 Maribo
 Sakskøbing
 Nykøbing
 Stubbekøbing

Odense 

 Odense
 Odense
 Kerteminde
 Assens
 Middelfart
 Bogense
 Otterup

Svendborg 

 Nyborg
 Gudme
 Svendborg
 Ærøskøbing-Faaborg
 Højrup
 Rudkøbing

Hjørring 

 Frederikshavn
 Sæby
 Hjørring
 Vraa
 Halvrimme

Thisted 

 Thisted
 Hurup
 Nykøbing

Aalborg 

 Aalborg
 Aalborg
 Bællum
 Aars
 Nibe
 Nørresundby

Viborg 

 Skive
 Viborg
 Kjellerup
 Søndervinge
 Løvel

Randers 

 Mariager
 Randers
 Borup
 Hornslet
 Grenaa
 Æbeltoft

Aarhus 

 Odder
 Århus
 Århus
 Århus
 Skjoldelev

Skanderborg 

 Horsens
 Skanderborg
 Østbirk
 Silkeborg

Vejle 

 Fredericia
 Kolding
 Vejle
 Give
 Bjerre
 Vonsild

Ringkøbing 

 Ringkøbing
 Lemvig
 Holstebro
 Vinderup
 Herning
 Skjern

Ribe 

 Varde
 Esbjerg
 Ribe
 Bække
 Guldager

Sønderjylland (From 1920) 

 Haderslev
 Aabenraa
 Sønderborg
 Augustenborg
 Tønder
 Løgumkloster
 Rødding

Notes

References 

 
Denmark
Denmark politics-related lists